Erle Ennis Johnston Jr.  (October 10, 1917 - September 26, 1995) was a public official, newspaperman, author, and mayor in Mississippi. He was campaign associate for Ross Barnett and wrote a biography of the segregationist governor. In 1960, Barnett appointed him public relations director of the pro-segregation Mississippi State Sovereignty Commission. Johnston became its executive director and continued to hold the public relations duties. He held the position under Governor Paul B. Johnson, Jr. before resigning in 1968. He worked at The Scott County Times before buying it. Johnston was mayor of Forest from 1981 to 1985. 

He was born in Garyville, Louisiana. He attended Grenada High School. 

In May 1962 he gave a commencement speech at Grenada High School titled "The Practical Way to Maintain a Separate School System in Mississippi" in which he criticized the "extremism" of the NAACP and Citizens Councils. He oversaw production of the Sovereignty Commission's film The Message from Mississippi.

He wrote I Rolled with Ross: A Political Portrait published in 1980, Mississippi’s Defiant Years, 1953–1973 published in 1990, and Politics: Mississippi Style published in 1993.

He was interviewed July 30, 1980 for Eyes on the Prize. The University of Southern Mississippi has a collection of his papers.

Johnston died September 26, 1995 from heart failure while in hospital.

ReferencesThis draft is in progress as of October 18, 2022.''

1917 births
1995 deaths